The Alco School is a former educational facility located just north of Arkansas Highway 66 in rural western Stone County, Arkansas, not far from the hamlet of Alco.  It is a single-story stone structure, with a hip roof that has two eyebrow dormers.  The main entry is on the western facade, sheltered by a parapeted porch.  The interior originally had two classrooms, and has been converted to residential use.  The school was built in 1938 as a National Youth Administration works project.

The school building was listed on the National Register of Historic Places in 1992.

See also 
 Turkey Creek School
 National Register of Historic Places listings in Stone County, Arkansas

References 

Educational institutions established in 1925
Defunct schools in Arkansas
Educational institutions disestablished in 1949
School buildings on the National Register of Historic Places in Arkansas
Buildings and structures in Stone County, Arkansas
National Register of Historic Places in Stone County, Arkansas
1925 establishments in Arkansas
National Youth Administration